The 1977 New York Giants season was the franchise's 53rd season in the National Football League (NFL). The Giants had a 5–9 record in 1977 and finished in a tie for last place with the Philadelphia Eagles.

The Giants selected defensive end Gary Jeter in the 1977 NFL Draft with the fifth overall pick. Before the season, the Giants signed quarterback Joe Pisarcik, who won the starting position to replace Craig Morton, whom they had traded to the Denver Broncos. New York won their opening game of the year against the Washington Redskins, prevailing 20–17 on a field goal by Joe Danelo in the final seconds. After losses in their next three games, victories over the San Francisco 49ers and Redskins evened the Giants’ record at 3–3. Afterwards, New York lost six of their last eight games. With a season-ending 12–9 defeat by the Chicago Bears in overtime, the team concluded the year at 5–9.

Offensively, New York's season total of 181 points was lower than all but four of the 27 other NFL teams. Pisarcik started 11 of the Giants' 14 games in 1977 and threw for 1,346 yards, but had 14 passes intercepted and only four touchdowns. Bobby Hammond led the Giants in rushing with 154 carries for 577 yards. Doug Kotar and Larry Csonka also rushed for more than 450 yards each. The team's leading receiver statistically was Jimmy Robinson, who caught 22 passes for 422 yards and three touchdowns. Gary Shirk was the only other Giants player with multiple touchdown catches, while Johnny Perkins was second behind Robinson with 20 receptions. On defense, cornerback Bill Bryant led New York with three interceptions. For the second consecutive season, linebacker Brad Van Pelt was the only Giant to make the Pro Bowl.

Offseason

NFL Draft

Roster

Schedule 

Note: Intra-division opponents are in bold text.

Game summaries

Week 3 
TV Station: CBS
TV Announcers: Lindsey Nelson, Paul Hornung
Atlanta Falcons quarterback Scott Hunter set up Monroe Eley's one-yard plunge early in the second period with an 18-yard bootleg and backup quarterback Kim McQuilken led an 80-yard scoring drive in the final period to give the Falcons a 17–3 win over the Giants.

Week 5 
TV Station: CBS
TV Announcers: Vin Scully, Alex Hawkins
Joe Pisarcik's 37-yard touchdown pass to tight end Gary Shirk and a pair of field goals by Joe Danelo helped give New York a narrow 20–17 victory, their first in four games. 49ers quarterback Jim Plunkett started a San Francisco rally. Touchdowns by Wilbur Jackson on a one-yard run and wide receiver Gene Washington on a 47-yard pass made the game close.

Week 6

Week 14

Standings

References 

New York Giants seasons
New York Giants
New York Giants
20th century in East Rutherford, New Jersey
Meadowlands Sports Complex